Yancey Dirk Thigpen (born August 15, 1969) is an American former professional football player who was a wide receiver in the National Football League (NFL) for the San Diego Chargers (1991), the Pittsburgh Steelers (1992–1997), and the Tennessee Oilers/Titans (1998–2000).  Before his NFL career, he played for Winston-Salem State University, where he also played collegiate basketball.

National Football League years
Thigpen played infrequently in his first three seasons, but had a breakout year in 1994, catching 36 passes for 546 yards. Then in 1995, he made the Pro Bowl, catching 85 passes for 1,307 yards and five touchdowns, and assisting his team to Super Bowl XXX, where he recorded three catches for 19 yards and a touchdown in the Steelers 27–17 loss to the Dallas Cowboys. His tough style of play earned him the nickname "Meatball," which was later changed to "Phil" when he joined the Oilers in 1998.

Thigpen played only six games in the following season due to injuries, but made a full recovery in the 1997 season, catching 79 passes for 1,398 yards and 7 touchdowns and making his second Pro Bowl selection.

In 1998, he signed a five-year, $21 million contract with the Oilers, which at the time was the highest known contract ever signed among wide receivers. He went on to play with them for the final three seasons of his career, assisting the team (now known as the Titans) to Super Bowl XXXIV in the 1999 season. Such a large contract for a wide receiver was a signal of the role which wide receivers would begin to play in the NFL. Thigpen retired after the 2000 season with 313 career receptions for 5,081 yards and 30 touchdowns.  He also rushed for four yards, returned two punts for 30 yards, and gained 188 yards on eight kickoff returns.

References

1969 births
Living people
People from Tarboro, North Carolina
American football wide receivers
Winston-Salem State Rams football players
San Diego Chargers players
Pittsburgh Steelers players
Tennessee Oilers players
Tennessee Titans players
American Conference Pro Bowl players
Players of American football from North Carolina